Bookers Tower is a Grade II listed four-storey octagonal tower built in the 19th century, in the Gothic style. It is in Guildford, Surrey, and can be found along Beech Lane, behind the Mount Cemetery (resting place of Lewis Carroll).

Built on high ground to the west of Guildford town centre, it was commissioned by the then mayor of Guildford, Charles Booker in memory of his sons, Charles and Henry, who had both died at the age of 15, and was completed in 1839. After its completion it was used to commemorate Queen Victoria's marriage to Albert, in 1840. In later years Bookers Tower was used by the Victorian scientist, John Rand Capron, in experiments involving lightning. In World War II it was used an air raid observation post.

The tower is not open to the public.

References

Buildings and structures in Guildford
Towers in Surrey
Grade II listed buildings in Surrey